Carlisle Airport may refer to: 

Carlisle Lake District Airport in Carlisle, Cumbria, United Kingdom
Carlisle Municipal Airport in Lonoke County, Arkansas, United States
Carlisle Airport (Pennsylvania) in Pennsylvania, United States